Baofeng may refer to:
 Baofeng County - in Henan Province, China
 Baofeng Lake - in Henan Province, China
 Baofeng railway station - in Henan Province, China
  - a radio equipment manufacturer in China